"This Afternoon" is a song by Canadian rock band Nickelback. It is the eighth single from their album Dark Horse, released on March 23, 2010.

Music video
The music video for the song was released on May 4 and was directed by Nigel Dick.

In the video, a fraternity of college geeks throws a huge party to "prove to the world that the nerd brigade knows how to rock".  One member is tasked with supplying the beer; another is assigned to find hot women to attend the party. Then another member arrives after having kidnapped Nickelback to play at the party; the fraternity leader however remarks "... Nickelback?  You got me Nickelback?!  ... Alright, fine, they'll do."  The party then proceeds as Nickelback are forced by 2 football players, after the leader says, "Boys, get 'Em in there!" to play their song.

The video for "This Afternoon" was first shown on the Fuse website and can now be seen as their 'Video Of The Day' for May 1, 2010.

The song contains strong lyrical content suggestive of cannabis use and production, including an allusion to Bob Marley as well as Cheech and Chong.

Track listing
CD single (Japanese release)
"This Afternoon" (Single Edit)
"Next Go Round"
"This Afternoon" (Instrumental)

CD single (European release)
"This Afternoon" (Single Edit)
"How You Remind Me" (Live)

Chart performance
The song has been a success on the Billboard Hot 100, peaking at number thirty-four. It is the band's highest-charting single since "If Today Was Your Last Day" and is also the band's 10th top-forty song.

In Germany, the song debuted at No. 84, but climbed quickly. In its third week it reached the top fifty by jumping to No. 49 and in its seventh week it entered the top thirty by reaching No. 29

In July 2010, the video landed on CMT's Top Twenty Countdown at number 13 and went into medium rotation on the channel.

Weekly charts

Year-end charts

Certifications

References

2008 songs
2010 singles
Nickelback songs
Music videos directed by Nigel Dick
Songs written by Robert John "Mutt" Lange
Song recordings produced by Robert John "Mutt" Lange
Songs written by Chad Kroeger
Country rock songs
Songs about cannabis
Songs about alcohol
Songs written by Mike Kroeger
Songs written by Ryan Peake
Roadrunner Records singles